Elias Mahmoudi is an Algerian-French Muay Thai fighter currently signed to ONE Championship, where he competes in the Flyweight division. He is the former WPMF World 61 kg and WBC Muaythai International super featherweight champion. As of November 24, 2022, he is ranked #5 in the ONE Flyweight Muay Thai rankings.

Muay Thai career
Mahmoudi faced Ryan Sheehan at Best of Siam VII on December 11, 2015. He won the fight by unanimous decision.

Mahmoudi won his first major title in January 2018, when he defeated Luca Roma by a first-round knockout to win the WPMF World 61 kg title.

In February 2019, Mahmoudi fought Rustam Vyntu at Ring War for the WBC Muay Thai International Super Featherweight title. He beat Vyntu by a third-round TKO.

ONE Championship
Elias Mahmoudi made his ONE debut on January 25, 2019 at ONE Championship: Hero's Ascent, facing Yukinori Ogasawara. He won his promotional debut by unanimous decision. 

On May 10, 2019, he fought Petchdam Petchyindee Academy at ONE Championship: Warriors Of Light for the ONE Flyweight Kickboxing World Championship. The fight went to a technical decision in the fourth round, as Elias was unable to continue the fight due to an illegal blow. Petchdam won the fight by unanimous decision. 

He had one more fight with ONE Championship in 2019, against Lerdsila Chumpairtour at ONE Championship: Mark Of Greatness. Mahmoudi won the fight by unanimous decision.

He was scheduled to challenge for the Arena Fight title against Djany Fiorenti during AFC 2, but the fight was later postponed due to the COVID-19 pandemic.

After a year of inactivity, Mahmoudi is scheduled to face former ONE Flyweight Muay Thai World Champion Jonathan Haggerty at ONE on TNT 4 on April 28, 2021. However, the fight was canceled for unknown reasons. 

Mahmoudi faced Mongkolpetch Petchyindee Academy in the main event of ONE Championship: Full Blast 2 on June 11, 2021. Mahmoudi lost the fight by majority decision.

Mahmoudi was scheduled to face Walter Goncalves at ONE Championship: Heavy Hitters on January 14, 2022.

Titles and accomplishments

Amateur
 2014 Siam Fight Junior Champion
 2013 ICO Junior −50kg World Champion
 2013 IFMA Junior −48kg World Champion
 France Muay Thai Champion

Professional

 2019 WBC Muay Thai International Super Featherweight Champion
 2018 WPMF World −61kg Champion
 2009 Theprasit Stadium Champion

Fight record

|-  style="background:#FFBBBB;"
| 2021-06-11|| Loss ||align=left| Mongkolpetch Petchyindee Academy ||  |ONE Championship: Full Blast 2 || Singapore || Decision (Majority) || 3 || 3:00
|-  style="background:#cfc;"
| 2019-12-09||Win ||align=left| Lerdsila Chumpairtour ||  |ONE Championship: Mark Of Greatness || Kuala Lumpur, Malaysia || Decision (Unanimous) || 3 || 3:00 
|-
|- style="background:#FFBBBB;"
| 2019-05-10|| Loss|| align="left" | Petchdam Petchyindee Academy || ONE Championship: Warriors Of Light || Bangkok, Thailand|| Technical Decision (Low Blow)|| 5 || 0:29
|-
! style=background:white colspan=9 |
|-  style="background:#cfc;"
| 2019-02-23|| Win ||align=left| Rustam Vyntu || Ring War || Italy || TKO (Referee Stoppage/Punches) || 3 ||  
|-
! style=background:white colspan=9 |
|-  style="background:#cfc;"
| 2019-01-25|| Win ||align=left| Yukinori Ogasawara || ONE Championship: Hero's Ascent || Manila || Decision || 3 || 3:00
|-  style="background:#cfc;"
| 2018-10-21|| Win ||align=left|  Macauley Coyle || Muay Thai Grand Prix || Paris, France || KO (Right High Kick) || 2 ||
|-  style="background:#FFBBBB;"
| 2018-06-17|| Loss||align=left| Yuta Murakoshi ||K-1 World GP 2018: Featherweight Championship Tournament, Quarter Final || Saitama, Japan || Ext.R Decision (Split)|| 4 || 3:00
|-  style="background:#FFBBBB;"
| 2018-02-27 || Loss ||align=left| Rangkhao Wor.Sangprapai || Best Of Siam XII Lumpinee Stadium || Bangkok, Thailand || Decision|| 5 || 3:00
|-  style="background:#cfc;"
| 2018-01-27 || Win ||align=left| Luca Roma || Thai Boxe Mania 2018 || Italy || KO (Front Kick) || 1 ||  
|-
! style=background:white colspan=9 |
|-  style="background:#cfc;"
| 2017-11-18 || Win ||align=left| Yin Shuai || Glory of Heroes: China VS Switzerland  || Martigny, Switzerland || Decision || 3 || 3:00
|-  style="background:#cfc;"
| 2017-10-28 || Win ||align=left| Madiale Samb|| Muay Thai Grand Prix, Final || Paris, France || Decision || 3 || 3:00
|-  style="background:#cfc;"
| 2017-10-28 || Win ||align=left| Frédéric Manach|| Muay Thai Grand Prix, Semi Final || Paris, France || Decision || 3 || 3:00
|-  style="background:#FFBBBB;"
| 2017-04-02|| Loss ||align=left| Haruma Saikyo || Krush.75 || Japan || Decision (Majority)|| 3 || 3:00
|-  style="background:#cfc;"
| 2017-01-28 || Win ||align=left| Carlos Coello Canales || Thai Boxe Mania 2017 || Italy || Decision || 3 || 3:00
|-  style="background:#FFBBBB;"
| 2016-11-03|| Loss ||align=left| Kaito Ozawa || K-1 World GP 2016 -57.5kg World Tournament, Semi Final || Tokyo, Japan || Decision (Unanimous)|| 3 || 3:00
|-  style="background:#CCFFCC;"
| 2016-11-03|| Win ||align=left| Ryuma Tobe || K-1 World GP 2016 -57.5kg World Tournament, Quarter Final || Tokyo, Japan || Decision (Unanimous)|| 3 || 3:00
|-  style="background:#fbb;"
| 2016-09-17 || Loss ||align=left| Feng Tianhao || Rise of Heroes 1 57kg Tournament Semi finals  || Chaoyang, China || Decision || 3 || 3:00
|-  style="background:#cfc;"
| 2016-01-30 || Win ||align=left| Andrea Roberti || Thai Boxe Mania 2016 || Italy || Decision || 3 || 3:00
|-  style="background:#cfc;"
| 2015-12-11 || Win ||align=left| Ryan Sheehan || Best Of Siam 7 || Paris, France || Decision (Unanimous)|| 5 || 3:00
|-  style="background:#cfc;"
| 2015-07-01 || Win ||align=left| Tarik Totts || Emperor Chok Dee – Young Battle || France || Decision || 5 || 3:00
|-  style="background:#cfc;"
| 2015-05-23 || Win ||align=left| Rui Botelho|| Radikal Fight Night 3 || France || Decision || 5 || 3:00
|-  style="background:#cfc;"
| 2015-03-07|| Win ||align=left| Kevin Rouffle || Le Choc des Légendes || France || KO || 1 ||
|-  style="background:#cfc;"
| 2014-08 || Win ||align=left|  || Rajadamnern Stadium || Bangkok, Thailand || KO (Front Kick) || 1 ||
|-  style="background:#cfc;"
| 2014-07 || Win ||align=left| ||  || Thailand || KO || 1 ||
|-  style="background:#cfc;"
| 2011-07 || Win ||align=left| || Bangla stadium || Phuket, Thailand || KO (Spinning Elbow)|| 2 ||
|-  style="background:#cfc;"
| 2009-07|| Win ||align=left|  || Theprasit stadium || Pattaya, Thailand || KO (Knee to the body)|| 1 ||   
|-
! style=background:white colspan=9 |
|-
| colspan=9 | Legend:    

|-  bgcolor="#CCFFCC"
| 2014-04-20 || Win||align=left| Joe Lemaire || || England || KO (Knee to the Body) ||3 || 
|-
! style=background:white colspan=9 |
|-  bgcolor="#CCFFCC"
| 2014-02-28 || Win||align=left| Ahmed Ibrahim ||Siam Fight Productions || Phoenix, United States || Decision || || 
|-
! style=background:white colspan=9 |
|-  bgcolor="#CCFFCC"
| 2013-11-16 || Win||align=left| George Mann || Rising Champions|| United Kingdom || Decision ||5 ||2:00 
|-
! style=background:white colspan=9 |
|-  bgcolor="#CCFFCC"
| 2013 || Win||align=left|  || || Netherlands || KO (Referee Stoppage)|| ||
|-  bgcolor="#CCFFCC"
| 2013 || Win||align=left| Deniz Demirkapu || || Belgium || Decision || ||
|-  bgcolor="#CCFFCC"
| 2013-03 || Win||align=left| Ali Karadayi || 2013 IFMA Junior World Championship, Final|| Istanbul, Turkey || Decision || 3 || 3:00
|-
! style=background:white colspan=9 |
|-  bgcolor="#CCFFCC"
| 2013-03 || Win||align=left| Syoykou Daulet || 2013 IFMA Junior World Championship, Semi Final|| Istanbul, Turkey || Forfeit||  ||
|-  bgcolor="#CCFFCC"
| 2013-03 || Win||align=left| Chavdar Stanislav || 2013 IFMA Junior World Championship, Quarter Final|| Istanbul, Turkey || Decision || 3 || 3:00 
|-
| colspan=9 | Legend:

See also
List of male kickboxers

References

French male kickboxers
French Muay Thai practitioners
1998 births
Living people
ONE Championship kickboxers